WOBR-FM (95.3 MHz, "Pirate 95.3") is a radio station broadcasting a mainstream rock format. Licensed to Wanchese, North Carolina, United States, it serves the Outer Banks.  The station is currently owned by East Carolina Radio, Inc.

History

The station was the Outer Banks' first FM station, signing on in 1973. At first the station simulcasted their adult contemporary AM sister station during the day and broadcast easy listening music after the AM signed off at night. In the early 1980s, the station became a full-time beautiful music station, but later evolved into adult contemporary, and finally an AAA format by end of the 1980s as "Beach 95FM". In the early 1990s East Carolina Radio brought the station, and the AAA format eventually developed into an alternative rock format as "The Wave". In 1997, the station adjusted the format to "Modern Adult Contemporary". By the end of the 1990s it had become classic rock as "The Rock".

On December 5, 2012 at 10 am WOBR relaunched as "Pirate 95.3 - Rock Without Rules" the next day, playing a mix of classic rock and active rock.

Trivia
Popular Norfolk radio personality Henry "The Bull" Del Toro, was briefly Program Director and Afternoon drive at WOBR in the late 1990s. This was Del Toro's last radio job before his death in 2002.

References

External links
Pirate 95.3 Online

OBR